The GCC Games is a regional multi-sport event which involves participants from the Gulf Cooperation Council region. The GCC Games, a quadrennial multi-sport event, was established by the union and first held in 2011. There are numerous long-running GCC Championships for individual sports, including: the Gulf Cooperation Council Athletics Championships (first held in 1986; youth section from 2000) football,  Archery, Athletics, Badminton, sailing, basketball, Swimming, Marathon Swimming, Diving, Water Polo, Artistic Swimming, tennis, gymnastics (senior and youth levels), weightlifting, futsal, snooker,  Cycling (BMX Freestyle, BMX Racing, Road Cycling, Track Cycling), Chess and table tennis. The 3rd edition of the game had to be organized in June 2019, but held in 2022 due to the internal issues between the GCC state countries. The 4th edition has been announced and will happen as per the announced dates. For the first time the games will be organized by the new, young and talented faces of GCC team.

GCC Games

GCC Beach Games
 Main Article : GCC Beach Games

GCC Women’s Games
 Main Article : GCC Women’s Games

6th was held in 2019. Bahrain finished with 77 medals, UAE (54), Kuwait (50) Qatar (32), KSA (11) and Oman.

GCC Youth Games
 Main Article : GCC Youth Games

See also
 Pan Arab Games

References

Gulf Cooperation Council
Sport in the Middle East